Charles R. Drew University of Medicine and Science is a private historically black graduate school in Willowbrook, California. It was founded in 1966 in response to inadequate medical access within the Watts region of Los Angeles, California. The university is named in honor of Charles R. Drew.

History
Charles R. Drew Postgraduate Medical School was incorporated in the State of California as a private, nonprofit educational institution in 1966 in response to the McCone Commission's recommendations to improve access to healthcare in South Los Angeles following the Watts Riots in 1965.
In 1973, Governor Ronald Reagan signed Senate Bill 1026 authored by State Senator Mervyn Dymally to allocate funding and support for the institution from the General Fund to the University of California. In January 1970, the offices of the Charles R. Drew Postgraduate Medical School and the Watts-Willowbrook Regional Medical program formally opened at 12012 Compton Avenue, and would serve as the central center for CDU's operations until the W.M. Cobb Building's construction in 1984.

Three schools and colleges are housed on CDU's 11-acre campus: the College of Science and Health, the College of Medicine and the Mervyn M. Dymally School of Nursing (MMDSON).

In May 1978, a proposed agreement between the Charles R. Drew Postgraduate Medical School and the UCLA School of Medicine to jointly establish an undergraduate medical program at Drew was approved. Medical students complete their first two years of medical school at the David Geffen School of Medicine at UCLA, then finish their last two years of clinical work at Charles R. Drew University, including rotations at the Martin Luther King Jr Outpatient Center as well as local community clinics near the Charles R. Drew University campus.

The Mervyn M. Dymally School of Nursing opened in 2010. The school was the first comprehensive nursing program to open in Southern California in decades, and the first ever of its kind in South Los Angeles.

In 2010, the university introduced the Community Faculty Track, a unique model for community-academic partnerships in which community leaders are integrated into the university's research goals and the education of medical professionals.

In 2018, the school partnered with Ross University School of Medicine, a for-profit medical school in Barbados, to educate doctors for South Los Angeles, since Charles R. Drew University typically receives more than 3,000 medical school applications, but only has space for 28 medical students each year.

In September 2020, Bloomberg Philanthropies made a $100 million donation to the four historically black medical schools in existence in the United States: Charles R. Drew University of Medicine and Science, Meharry Medical College, the Morehouse School of Medicine, and Howard University College of Medicine.

In February 2022, MacKenzie Scott made a $20 million, unrestricted donation to Charles R. Drew University of Medicine and Science,  the largest private donation in the university's history.

Presidents

Academics

Schools and colleges 
 College of Medicine
 College of Science and Health
 Mervyn M. Dymally School of Nursing

Research
Faculty members at CDU conduct ongoing NIH and DoD-funded research on conditions such as hypertension, diabetes, cancer, tobacco use and HIV/AIDs. The university's Department of Research and Health Affairs was initially established as the Office of Research in 1973 to organize the assignment of research activities at the institution and provide a focus for encouraging faculty participation in laboratory activities. The Marginalization-related Diminished Returns (MDRs) Research Center is also housed at CDU. The MDRs Research Center explores how structural racism causes poor health in middle-class people of color, as observed through the weaker effects of socioeconomic status indicators on the health and well-being of marginalized populations compared to Whites.

Physician Assistant Program
The Physician Assistant program at the Charles R. Drew Postgraduate Medical School (now "CDU") began as MEDEX in 1971. It was one of the first MEDEX programs to open in the state of California.

MEDEX students at Drew received their instruction from physician faculty at UCLA until March 1973, when they moved to what was then known as the Martin Luther King, Jr. General Hospital in Watts. The physician assistant program, which was originally an undergraduate program, returned to the university in August 2016 as a master’s degree granting program after a five-year closure period that began in 2011.

Residency Programs 
In September 2017, the L.A. County Board of Supervisors voted to allocate $800,000 to CDU to fund two residency training programs in Family Medicine and Psychiatry. The funds were made available through a Pre-Medical School Affiliation Agreement signed between L.A. County and CDU in October 2017. A Medical School Affiliation Agreement between L.A. County Health Agency and CDU provides the programs with support of up to $14.6 million until 2023. Residents began their programs in Family Medicine and Psychiatry in July 2018,  meaning that the university offered residency training as part of its curriculum for the first time since the closure of the former King-Drew Medical Center, and consequently the university's own training programs, in 2007.

Accreditation 
CDU is recognized as a minority-serving institution by the U.S. Office for Civil Rights, as well as a historically black graduate institution under the U.S. Department of Education's Strengthening Historically Black Graduate Institutions Program, also known as Title III B. CDU is also a member of the Hispanic Association of Colleges and Universities and the Thurgood Marshall College Fund.

The university is regionally accredited by the Western Association of Schools and Colleges (WASC). In 2009, WASC placed the university on probation; it was removed from probation two years later. Programs at the university are also accredited by  the National League for Nursing Accrediting Commission and the Commission on Collegiate Nursing Education.

Association with Martin Luther King Jr. Hospital

Martin Luther King Jr. Hospital closed in 2007. Both the university, which is private, and associated County-owned public hospital fell into serious trouble at the outset of the 21st century.  By 2006, several residency programs had to be terminated because they lost accreditation for not meeting the necessary amount of oversight, and the hospital itself was forced into a radical restructuring plan in late 2006. The restructuring caused the County-owned hospital to sever its ties to the neighboring private, non-profit medical school and terminate support to 248 medical residents.  In October 2006, the national Accreditation Council for Graduate Medical Education informed school officials that it planned to revoke the university's ACGME accreditation because of the hospital's upcoming loss of Medicare money; as a result the university voluntarily withdrew its accreditation.  The school was  eligible to seek reinstatement to relaunch its residency program in July 2008.  As a response to the problems, the university reorganized, terminating its president, and dismissed nearly two-thirds of its board of trustees.

On March 6, 2007, officials from the university announced that they would sue Los Angeles County for $125 million for breach of contract, claiming that the restructuring of the hospital gutted the adjacent university.  In September 2009, the lawsuit was settled with an agreement under which the county would rent space to the university on favorable terms and the county and university would work together toward the reopening of MLK Hospital.

In June 2007, the school began an 18-month rebranding effort aimed at preventing people from associating the school with the continuing ordeals of King-Harbor; the school criticized the hospital for leaving an old sign bearing the King/Drew name.

Notable faculty 
Notable past and present Charles R. Drew University faculty members include Dr. Patricia Bath, an ophthalmologist and the first black female doctor to receive a medical patent, for inventing a laser treatment for cataracts  and Dr. Deborah Prothrow-Stith, a pioneer in addressing youth violence as a public health issue and the first woman Commissioner of Public Health for the Commonwealth of Massachusetts. Dr. Prothrow-Stith is Professor of Internal Medicine and current Dean of the College of Medicine. Finally, Dr. Shervin Assari directs the Marginalization-related Diminished Returns (MDRs) Research Center at CDU. He is a nationally recognized researcher in the area of structural racism, having coined the term "MDRs," and has authored 400+ peer reviewed publications and has an h index of 63.

See also
Martin Luther King Jr. Community Hospital — adjacent, opened in 2015.
King/Drew Magnet High School of Medicine and Science — adjacent.
Martin Luther King Jr.-Harbor Hospital/King Drew Hospital  — formerly adjacent.
History of African Americans in Los Angeles

References

External links 
 

Universities and colleges in Los Angeles County, California
Medical schools in California
Drew
Drew
Drew
Drew
Drew
Private universities and colleges in California